Iotroxic acid (trade name Biliscopin), used in the form of meglumine iotroxate, is a molecule used as a contrast medium during X-rays. It is specifically used during tests looking at the gallbladder and biliary tract. It is given by slow injection into a vein.

Side effects are uncommon. They include vomiting, skin flushing, headache, itchiness, and low blood pressure. Rare side effects include seizures and allergic reactions. It should not be used by those who have an iodine allergy. Iotroxic acid is an iodine containing contrast media of the diionic dimer type.

Iotroxic acid was first made in 1976. It is on the World Health Organization's List of Essential Medicines. It is rarely used in the developed world due to the availability of magnetic resonance cholangiopancreatography (MRCP).

References

External links 
 

Acetanilides
Benzoic acids
Iodoarenes
Radiocontrast agents
World Health Organization essential medicines
Wikipedia medicine articles ready to translate